Ruut Tarmo (26 April 1896 – 28 January 1967) was an Estonian stage and film actor and stage director whose career spanned more than five decades.

Early life
Ruut Tarmo was born Harald Rudolf Klein in Tartu in 1896 to Julius Klein and Sohvi Klein (née Anja) and he began his career on stages in his hometown in 1912. In 1914 he began an engagement at the prestigious Vanemuine Theatre and would later travel the world's stages (including at least two appearances on London stages with fellow countryman Ants Eskola), as well as at the Estonian National Opera and the Estonian Drama Theatre. In 1927 he would make his film debut in the Aksella Luts and Theodor Luts-penned and directed silent film drama Noored kotkad (English: Young Eagles), which chronicled Estonian soldiers fighting in the Estonian War of Independence from 1918 to 1920.

Arrest
Following the invasion and annexation of Estonia during World War II by the Soviet Union, Tarmo was arrested by Soviet authorities, along with many other artists and intellectuals such as his wife, actress Mari Möldre and author Heiti Talvik, and sentenced to prison. Upon his release, he was forbidden to participate in the arts until the death of Joseph Stalin. Upon the ban being lifted, Tarmo returned to the stage and screen. In 1955, he made his first post-ban film appearance in a comedic short titled Värav nr. 2, directed by Oleg Lentsius.

Death and legacy
Tarmo would remain a popular stage and film actor until his death in Tallinn in 1967. In 1971, his wife would write a posthumous biography of the actor; Ruut Tarmo, published by Eesti Raamat in Tallinn. In 2010, a play titled Mari ja Ruut was performed at the Estonian Drama Theatre which chronicled the lives of Tarmo and wife Mari Möldre during Tarmo's imprisonment.

Awards
Honored Artist of the Estonian SSR (1959) 
People's Artist of the Estonian SSR (1966)

References

External links

1896 births
1967 deaths
Male actors from Tartu
Estonian male stage actors
Estonian male film actors
Estonian male silent film actors
Estonian prisoners and detainees
Prisoners and detainees of the Soviet Union
20th-century Estonian male actors